Canoeing at the 2018 Summer Youth Olympics was held from 12 to 16 October. The events took place at the Puerto Madero in Buenos Aires, Argentina.

Qualification

Each National Olympic Committee (NOC) can enter a maximum of 4 competitors, 2 per each gender and 1 per each boat type. 58 places were decided at the 2018 Youth Olympic Games World Qualification Event. The places were distributed by continental rankings; in total 14 C1 (1 from Africa, 1 from Oceania, 3 from America, 3 from Asia and 6 from Europe) and 15 K1 (1 from Oceania, 2 from Africa, 3 from America, 3 from Asia and 6 from Europe) boat quotas were allocated to each gender. As hosts, Argentina was given two boats, one for each gender to compete and a further four boats, two for each gender were decided by the tripartite committee.

All athletes must compete in both disciplines (slalom and sprint) or risk disqualification. To be eligible to participate at the Youth Olympics athletes must have been born between 1 January 2002 and 31 December 2003.

An athlete once selected for the YOG can participate in both categories (i.e. Canoe and Kayak), regardless if the NOC is already represented in that category.

C-1

K-1

Medal summary

Medal table

Boys' events

Girls' events

References

External links
Official Results Book – Canoe

 
2018 Summer Youth Olympics events
Youth Summer Olympics
2018
Canoeing in Argentina